is a 1957 black-and-white Japanese horror film directed by Morihei Magatani.

Cast 
 Juzaburo Akechi

References

External links 
 

Japanese horror films
Japanese black-and-white films
1957 films
1950s Japanese films